Tala Bar (also Romanized as Ţalā Bar; also known as Tīlābar) is a village in Kalashtar Rural District, in the Central District of Rudbar County, Gilan Province, Iran. At the 2006 census, its population was 58, in 18 families.

References 

Populated places in Rudbar County